Meon Carolyn Shand  (born 1939) is a New Zealand doctor, general practitioner and advocate for women's health, maternity care, contraception, abortion and the medical care of the victims of sexual abuse and child abuse.

Early life and education 
Shand was the daughter of farmer and politician Tom Shand and doctor Claudia Lilian Shand, née Weston. She had a brother Anthony and two sisters, Jill and Ann. She graduated with her medical degree from the University of Otago in 1962.

Career 
Shand was a house surgeon (a surgical "RMO" or "house officer") at Wellington Hospital early in her career but became a general practitioner, running a general practice in Wellington with her husband Erich Geiringer.

Shand has worked over the years to make abortions safe and available, with her colleague Margaret Sparrow. She was active in the Wellington branch of Sisters Overseas Service (SOS) in the late 1970s helping women to go to Australia for abortions. She pioneered work in the medical treatment of victims of sexual assault and child sex abuse.

Shand retired from her practice in 2017.

Honours and awards 
Shand was appointed a Companion of the New Zealand Order of Merit, for services to women's health, in the 2008 Queen's Birthday Honours.

Personal life 
Shand married doctor Erich Geiringer in 1964. They had three children, Claudia, Felix and Carl.

Selected works

Books 

 From recognition to recovery : a general practice guide to the medical management of sexual abuse, edited by Carol Shand and Robynanne Milford (1993) ISBN 0958325103
 The medical management of sexual abuse, edited by Carol Shand et al. (2002) ISBN 0473086808
 Things I Remember, or Was Told: a memoir (2022) ISBN 978-0-9941494-9-7

Journal articles

References 

Living people
New Zealand women medical doctors
University of Otago alumni
Companions of the New Zealand Order of Merit
New Zealand abortion-rights activists
1939 births
Weston family (New Zealand)